Estonian Freedom Party – Farmers' Assembly is an Estonian political party. The chairman of the party is Rein Koch.

The party declares itself as the legal successor of Farmers' Assemblies which was established on 5 October 1921.

References

External links
 

Political parties in Estonia
Agrarian parties